Mukangu is a settlement in Kenya's Central Province. It is located in the Murang'a District.

Climate 
Mukangu's climate is a tropical dry savanna.

References 

Populated places in Central Province (Kenya)